Brit Awards 1989  was the 9th edition of the Brit Awards, an annual pop music awards ceremony in the United Kingdom. It was organised by the British Phonographic Industry and took place on 13 February 1989 at Royal Albert Hall in London. This year marked the first presentation of the International Female Solo Artist and International Male Solo Artist awards.

The awards ceremony, hosted by Mick Fleetwood and Samantha Fox, was televised live by the BBC. The hosting was criticised for being poorly coordinated, with missed cues and incorrect introductions; the teleprompter did not work properly, and in 2010, Fox claimed that there had been multiple errors in the information given to the hosts on the night. The event organisers did not play a pre-recorded message from Michael Jackson, and the audience booed the government minister Kenneth Baker.

After the 1989 event, the awarding committee decided to have the Brit Awards recorded and broadcast on television the following night, to be able to edit out errors and unwanted happenings on the stage. The awards ceremony was not broadcast live again until the 2007 Brit Awards.

Performances
 Bros – "I Owe You Nothing"
 Def Leppard – "Pour Some Sugar on Me"
 Fairground Attraction – "Perfect"
 Gloria Estefan Miami Sound Machine – "Rhythm Is Gonna Get You"
 Randy Newman ft. Mark Knopfler and the BRITs Supergroup – "Falling in love"
 Tanita Tikaram – "Good Tradition"
 Yazz – "Got to Share"

Winners and nominees

Multiple nominations and awards
The following artists received multiple awards and/or nominations.

References

External links
Brit Awards 1989 at Brits.co.uk

Brit Awards
Brit Awards
BRIT Awards
BRIT Awards
Brit Awards
Brit Awards